Václav Stupka (born 28 July 1986) is a Slovak professional ice hockey left winger currently playing for HKM Zvolen of the Slovak Extraliga.

Career
Stupka began his career with his local team HK Trnava of the Slovak 1. Liga, making his pro debut for the team during the 2004–05 season. In 2010, Stupka moved to MsHK Žilina of the Tipsport Liga. After two seasons with Žilina, he joined ŠHK 37 Piešťany.

On June 30, 2014, Stupka joined HC Košice but returned to Piešťany on January 8, 2015. He then rejoined Žilina in July 2015 where he spent the next three seasons. 

On September 4, 2018, Stupka moved to the Elite Ice Hockey League in the United Kingdom, signing for Scottish team Glasgow Clan on an initial one-month contract before signing an extension to remain with the team for the remainder of the 2018–19 EIHL season. On August 16, 2019, Stupka returned to the Tipsport Liga with HC Nové Zámky.

Career statistics

Regular season and playoffs

Awards and honors

References

External links

 

1986 births
Living people
Slovak ice hockey left wingers
Sportspeople from Trnava
HK Trnava players
MsHK Žilina players
ŠHK 37 Piešťany players
HC Košice players
Glasgow Clan players
HC Nové Zámky players
HC '05 Banská Bystrica players
HKM Zvolen players
Slovak expatriate sportspeople in Scotland
Expatriate ice hockey players in Scotland
Slovak expatriate ice hockey people